Tartano (Lombard: Tarten) is a comune (municipality) in the Province of Sondrio in the Italian region Lombardy, located about  northeast of Milan and about  southwest of Sondrio.

Tartano borders the following municipalities: Albaredo per San Marco, Foppolo, Forcola, Fusine, Mezzoldo, Talamona, Valleve.

Demographic evolution

References

Cities and towns in Lombardy